The Kaufman Astoria Studios is a film studio located in the Astoria neighborhood of Queens in New York City. The studio was constructed for Famous Players-Lasky in 1920, since it was close to Manhattan's Theater District. The property was taken over by real estate developer George S. Kaufman in 1982 and renamed Kaufman Astoria Studios. 

The studio is home to New York City's only backlot, which opened in December 2013. The property was designated a national historic district and added to the National Register of Historic Places in 1978.

History

20th century 
The studio was originally constructed for Famous Players-Lasky in 1920 to provide the company with a facility close to the Broadway theater district. Many features and short subjects were filmed there between 1920 and 1933. The first Sherlock Holmes sound film, The Return of Sherlock Holmes (also 1929), was made at the studio by the British producer Basil Dean. The first two films featuring the Marx Brothers, The Cocoanuts (1929) and Animal Crackers (1930), were shot at the Astoria Studio. It was also known as the Paramount Studio.

After Paramount Pictures moved all studio operations to California in 1932, the Astoria location was turned over to independent producers, including Walter Wanger, whose films were released through Paramount or other Hollywood film companies. All the films starring tango icon Carlos Gardel made in the United States were shot at Astoria Studios. Gloria Swanson cites the studio as, "the studio where I'd been making all of my pictures since 1923" in her autobiography Swanson on Swanson. In 1938, ...One Third of a Nation... was the last feature film to be shot there during that era. 

In 1942, the United States Army Signal Corps Army Pictorial Service took over the studio for the making of Army training and indoctrination films until 1971, including  The Big Picture that was shown on American television as a network television series.

In 1975, the studio opened again for shooting on Thieves. The property was designated a national historic district and added to the National Register of Historic Places in 1978. The district encompasses six contributing buildings. In 1981, New York City received an Urban Development Action Grant from the federal government for the renovation and expansion of the studio which Kenneth Schuman, NYC Commissioner for Economic Development, described as being of "compelling public interest".  In 1982, the property was taken over by real estate developer George S. Kaufman and renamed Kaufman Astoria Studios.

21st century 

Kaufman Astoria Studios has seven sound stages including the new Stage K, designed by the Janson Design Group.

In 2008, Martin P. Robinson, who plays Mr. Snuffleupagus, Telly Monster, and Slimey the Worm on Sesame Street, married Annie Evans, a writer for the show on the Sesame Street set. The ceremony was performed on the steps of 123 Sesame Street and the reception was held throughout the rest of the set.

On December 3, 2013, a 34,800 square foot backlot was dedicated.  It is the only studio backlot in New York City. In 2014, Kaufman Astoria Studios announced plans to build a new 18,000-square-foot sound stage on its Astoria campus within two years. 

In 2020, Kaufman Astoria Studios announced a five-block redevelopment project around the studio, in conjunction with Larry Silverstein, Bedrock Real Estate, and ODA Architecture. The area would be called Innovation QNS and stretch from 37th to 43rd Streets from 35th to 36th Avenues. Construction could begin in 2023.

Notable productions 
Motion pictures filmed there include the musicals Hair and The Wiz, and the films Goodfellas and Carlito's Way. In 1984, The Jacksons' music video "Torture" was filmed there as well. The 1986 movie The Money Pit starring Tom Hanks and Shelley Long. Many sequences, especially the 'visitation' sequence in 2002 TV mini series Angels in America, were also shot there. A 2009 remake, The Taking of Pelham 1 2 3, also used the studios. In 2011, the remake of Arthur filmed a few scenes there.

Television shows filmed at the studio include Sesame Street, Orange Is The New Black, Onion News Network, Johnny and the Sprites,
Between  the Lions, The Wubbulous World of Dr. Seuss, Oobi, Where in the World Is Carmen Sandiego, and its successor Where in Time is Carmen Sandiego? Other projects recorded at the studios have included Judge Judy, Power of 10, The Cosby Show, Cosby, The Days and Nights of Molly Dodd, Swans Crossing, Law & Order, Million Dollar Password, the 2009 pilot of The $1,000,000 Pyramid, Video Power, Spin City, and Mariah Carey's MTV Unplugged. WFAN, a local sports radio station owned by Audacy, was formerly based at the studio before moving to lower Manhattan in the fall of 2009.

Performers' images 
The walls of the studio are lined with signed images of the performers who have worked in the studios, including Milton Berle, Frank Sinatra, The Marx Brothers, Ginger Rogers, George Burns, Lena Horne,  Ethel Merman, Paul Robeson, Lillian Gish, Claudette Colbert, Gloria Swanson, Maurice Chevalier, Jeanette MacDonald, Diana Ross, and Jerry Orbach.

References
Notes

Further reading
 
 Richard Koszarski, The Astoria Studio and Its Fabulous Films: A Picture History with 227 Stills and Photographs. New York: Dover Publications, 1983 (Dover Books on Cinema and the Stage), 
 Richard Koszarski, Hollywood on the Hudson: Film and Television in New York from Griffith to Sarnoff. New Brunswick, NJ / London: Rutgers University Press, 2008,

External links
 

 Army Pictorial Center, built in 1919 as Famous Players Studio

 Kaufman Astoria Studios at Internet Movie Database

American film studios
Astoria, Queens
Buildings and structures completed in 1920
Buildings and structures in Queens, New York
Buildings and structures on the National Register of Historic Places in New York City
Entertainment companies based in New York City
Historic American Buildings Survey in New York City
Historic districts in Queens, New York
National Register of Historic Places in Queens, New York
New York City Designated Landmarks in Queens, New York
Television studios in the United States